Malaysia competed in the 2021 Asian Youth Para Games which will be held in Manama, Bahrain from 2 to 6 December 2021. Malaysia contingent has 13 athletes who will compete in six sports and was led by chef de mission of delegation, Kumarusamy Sithambaram.

Malaysia won three gold.

Competitors
The following is the list of number of competitors in the Games:

Medalists

Athletics
Three sportspeople competed in athletics for the Malaysia:

Boys' track events

Boys' field events

Girls' field events

Girls' track events

Badminton
Malaysia had a sole competitor in badminton.

Boccia
Two players took part in the boccia for the Malaysia.

Powerlifting
Two players took part in the powerlifting for Malaysia.

Swimming
Three players took part in the swimming for Malaysia.

Boys'

Girls'

Table tennis
Two players took part in the table tennis for the Malaysia.

References

External links
 AYPG 2021 MEDIA RELEASE

Malaysia 2021
Asian Youth Para Games
Asian Youth Para Games, 2021
Nations at the 2021 Asian Youth Para Games